The electoral district of Norman was a Legislative Assembly electorate in the state of Queensland, Australia.

History
Norman was created in the 1949 redistribution, taking effect at the 1950 state election, and existed until the 1972 state election. It centred on East Brisbane and Norman Park.

When Norman was abolished in 1972, most of its area was incorporated into the district of South Brisbane.

Members

The following people were elected in the seat of Norman:

Election results

References

Former electoral districts of Queensland
1950 establishments in Australia
1972 disestablishments in Australia